NH 132 may refer to:

 National Highway 132 (India)
 New Hampshire Route 132, United States